Filshur (also Romanized as Fīlshūr; also known as Felīshūr) is a village in Frughan Rural District, Rud Ab District, Sabzevar County, Razavi Khorasan Province, Iran. At the 2006 census, its population was 277, in 79 families.

References 

Populated places in Sabzevar County